Athena Kolbe is an American human rights professor. She is employed with the University of North Carolina at Wilmington (UNCW). Kolbe joined the College of Health & Human Services (CHHS) School of Social Work faculty in August 2017.

Education
Kolbe received a PhD in Social Work & Political Science at the University of Michigan Ann Arbor. Kolbe’s professional experience includes work as an assistant professor of social work at the University of North Carolina Wilmington, social work instructor at the State University of New York Brockport and at the Institute of Social Work & Social Science in Port-au-Prince, Haiti. She has also worked as a journalist, a research assistant, a researcher, and a clinical social worker. Kolbe’s main areas of interest include human rights, needs assessment, and international social work.

Research on Lebanon 
In 2007 and 2008, Kolbe (along with co-authors Royce Hutson, Bernadette Stringer, Harry Shanon, Ted Haines and Imad Salamy) conducted the "Health Human Rights & Armed Violence in South Lebanon" study in South Lebanon. This study found that more than 5,000 people were injured and 70,000 homes damaged in the 2006 Lebanon War between Israel and Hizbollah.

References

Living people
Year of birth missing (living people)
University of Michigan alumni
University of North Carolina at Wilmington faculty
Social work scholars
Skidmore College alumni
Wayne State University alumni
State University of New York at Brockport faculty